Frontier Theatre was an early American weekly television film series, featuring Westerns, that aired on the now defunct DuMont Television Network. This hour-long summer series ran from May to September 1950.  The program aired Saturday nights from 6:30pm to 7:30pm ET on DuMont affiliates which carried the program.

Episode status
As with most DuMont network programs, no episodes are known to survive.

See also
List of programs broadcast by the DuMont Television Network
List of surviving DuMont Television Network broadcasts

References

Bibliography
David Weinstein, The Forgotten Network: DuMont and the Birth of American Television (Philadelphia: Temple University Press, 2004) 
Alex McNeil, Total Television, Fourth edition (New York: Penguin Books, 1980) 
Tim Brooks and Earle Marsh, The Complete Directory to Prime Time Network TV Shows, Third edition (New York: Ballantine Books, 1964)

External links
DuMont historical website

DuMont Television Network original programming
1950 American television series debuts
1950 American television series endings
Black-and-white American television shows